Vanessa Roberts Avery (born 1974/1975) is an American lawyer who has served as the United States attorney for the District of Connecticut since 2022.

Education

Avery received a Bachelor of Arts from Yale University in 1996 and a Juris Doctor from Georgetown University Law Center in 1999.

Career 

From 1999 to 2003, Avery was an attorney in the Hartford Trial Group at Cummings & Lockwood LLC. From 2004 to 2005, she served as a trial attorney at the United States Department of Justice in the Commercial Litigation Branch of the Civil Division. From 2006 to 2014, she was a litigation attorney at McCarter & English. From 2014 to 2019, she served as an Assistant United States Attorney in the United States Attorney's Office for the District of Connecticut. Since 2019, she has served as an associate attorney general in the Connecticut Attorney General's Office and as chief of the division of enforcement and public protection since 2021.

U.S. attorney for the District of Connecticut 

On January 26, 2022, President Joe Biden announced his intent to nominate Avery to be the United States Attorney for the District of Connecticut. Her nomination earned the praise of Connecticut Attorney General William Tong. On January 31, 2022, her nomination was sent to the United States Senate. On April 4, 2022, her nomination was favorably reported out of the Senate Judiciary Committee. On April 27, 2022, her nomination was confirmed in the Senate by voice vote. She became the first African-American woman to serve as U.S. Attorney for the District of Connecticut. She was sworn-in on May 9, 2022.

References

External links
 

1970s births
Living people
Place of birth missing (living people)
Year of birth missing (living people)
20th-century American women lawyers
20th-century American lawyers
21st-century American women lawyers
21st-century American lawyers
African-American lawyers
Assistant United States Attorneys
Connecticut lawyers
Georgetown University Law Center alumni
United States Attorneys for the District of Connecticut
United States Department of Justice lawyers
Yale University alumni